People's Action Future for Finnmark, also popularly called the Aune List (Aunelista), was a Norwegian political party which ran for the 1989 parliamentary election as a protest party against the more established parties of the country.

History
The action was started in March 1989, and on just three weeks about 4,000 people had joined it as members. It received members from parties ranging as wide as from the Red Electoral Alliance to the Progress Party. The action was originally headed by Vidar Karlstad, but was immediately also supported by Anders John Aune, a former Member of Parliament for the Labour Party. On 1 May 1989 Aune finally decided to run with the party for the 1989 election. By June 1989, the party had almost 7,000 members.

Among the issues for the party was a reduction of taxes in order to improve the conditions of the county which was haunted by poor fishing outputs and people moving out. After Prime Minister Gro Harlem Brundtland had visited the county the previous year, Karlstad stated that "it is incomprehensible for us that the Prime Minister of the country travels all over the world teaching other nations on how to govern themselves, while our county lay as a forgotten colony which people escape from".

In the 1989 election the party showed very successful, receiving 21.5% of the votes in the county of Finnmark and becoming the second biggest party. This gave the party one representative in the Norwegian parliament, of which its leader Anders John Aune served for a four-year term. The party however never ran for office again.

References

Political parties established in 1989
Political parties disestablished in 1993
Defunct political parties in Norway
1989 establishments in Norway
1993 disestablishments in Norway